Geita is a town and regional capital of Geita Region in northwestern Tanzania. The town is known for its gold trade. Geita, with a population of 99,795 (2012 census). It is located in the centre of a gold mining area. In March 2012 it became the administrative headquarters of the newly created Geita Region.

History
Geita first came into prominence as the site of a German colonial gold mine. A German gold prospector discovered the mineral in the early 1900s in the hills surrounding modern-day Geita town. This and other discoveries triggered a gold rush in the surrounding area, attracting German and native prospectors alike. The colonial government established a mine to exploit 'Bismarck Reef'. Mining activities significantly declined when Germany ceded control of its colonies to the British after their defeat in World War I.  

Geita regained prominence in the mid to late 1990s when the Tanzanian government opened the mineral sector to foreign investment. A number of medium to large-scale mining houses, including Ashanti and Anglo-American, conducted extensive exploration activities in the surrounding areas. The most significant outcome of those activities was the construction of the Geita Gold Mine, now owned by AngloGold Ashanti. The Geita Gold Mine is Tanzania's largest gold producer.  

Gold rushes continue to occur in areas surrounding Geita, mainly in and around Rwamagasa and Matabe. These gold rushes have attracted tens of thousands of prospectors from all around the country. Being subsistence miners, their activities are highly unregulated, resulting in dangerous mining practices and considerable environmental destruction, not the least of which are increased mercury pollution and extensive deforestation.

References

Populated places in Geita Region
Regional capitals in Tanzania